Natalie Talmadge (April 29, 1896 – June 19, 1969) was an American silent film actress who was the wife of Buster Keaton, and sister of the movie stars Norma and Constance Talmadge. She retired from acting in 1923.

Early life and career
Talmadge was born in Brooklyn, New York to Margaret L. "Peg" and Frederick O. Talmadge. She was the younger sister of Norma Talmadge and the older sister of Constance Talmadge, both of whom became successful film actresses.

She appeared in D.W. Griffith's Intolerance (1916), The Passion Flower (1921) with her sister Norma, and Buster Keaton's Our Hospitality (1923), her final film appearance.

Personal life

Marriage and children

Talmadge married actor Buster Keaton on May 31, 1921, at her sister Norma's home in Bayside, Queens. She was Roman Catholic, but the marriage was performed as a civil ceremony. 

They had two sons: Joseph Talmadge Keaton and Robert Talmadge Keaton. The couple lived a lavish lifestyle in Beverly Hills, Natalie spending prodigious amounts of money on clothes. After the birth of their second son, she decided not to have any more children, resulting in the couple staying in separate rooms. Keaton accepted this, and they agreed that he should keep any affairs discreet. 

Late in the marriage, Keaton's career began to suffer after his contract with Joseph M. Schenck was sold to Metro-Goldwyn-Mayer. After the couple's divorce was final on August 10, 1933, Talmadge legally changed their boys' names to "Talmadge", and denied them any contact with their father. In July 1942, the now-18 year old Robert and the now-20 year old Joseph made the name change legal after their mother won a court petition.

Later years and death
Natalie Talmadge was in frail health during her final years and was a resident of the Santa Monica Convalescent Home. She died of heart failure on June 19, 1969 at Santa Monica Hospital. She is buried in the Abbey of the Psalms in the Talmadge Room at Hollywood Forever Cemetery.

Filmography
 Intolerance (1916) *Uncredited role 
 His Wedding Night (1917) *Uncredited role
 A Country Hero (1917) *Lost film, uncredited role
Out West (1918)
The Isle of Conquest (1919) *Lost film
 The Love Expert (1920)
 Yes or No? (1920)
 The Haunted House (1921) *Uncredited role
 The Passion Flower (1921)
 Our Hospitality (1923)

Footnotes

Sources

Marion Meade (1995), Buster Keaton:  Cut to the Chase,.
1900 United States Federal Census, Brooklyn Ward 8, Kings, New York; Roll T623_1047; Page: 4B; Enumeration District: 109.
1910 United States Federal Census, Brooklyn Ward 29, Kings, New York; Roll T624_982; Page: 13B; Enumeration District: 933; Image: 948.

External links

 
 
 Natalie Talmadge at Virtual History

1896 births
1969 deaths
20th-century American actresses
Actresses from New York City
American film actresses
American silent film actresses
Burials at Hollywood Forever Cemetery
People from Brooklyn
Catholics from New York (state)
Women film pioneers